Fábio Luiz Carille de Araújo (born 26 September 1973), known as Fábio Carille, is a Brazilian football manager and former player who played either as a central defender or a left back. He is the manager of Japanese club V-Varen Nagasaki.

Playing career
Born in São Paulo, Carille was known as Fábio Luiz during his playing days. He moved to Sertãozinho at the age of 12, and made his senior debut with hometown side Sertãozinho in 1993, after a trial period.

In 1993, Carille moved to XV de Jaú, and impressed enough to earn a loan move to Corinthians in August 1995. He left the club in December, after making no first team appearances, and subsequently moved to Iraty.

Carille subsequently represented Coritiba, Paraná (two stints), Santa Cruz, XV de Piracicaba, Santo André and CRB while on loan from Iraty. In 2000, he signed a permanent deal with Juventus-SP, but also served loan stints at Botafogo-SP, Paraná and Chinese side Guangzhou.

After leaving the Moleque Travesso in 2004, Carille subsequently resumed his career with Gama, Monte Azul, Ulbra and Grêmio Barueri. He retired with the latter in April 2007, aged 33.

Managerial career

Grêmio Barueri
Immediately after retiring, Carille was named interim coach of Barueri, as head coach Sérgio Soares was relieved from his duties. He would subsequently remain at the club for two more seasons, acting as an assistant and under-20 coach.

Corinthians
In 2009, Carille moved to another club he represented as a player, Corinthians, as Mano Menezes' assistant. On 11 October 2010 he was appointed as interim coach, after Adílson Batista resigned. He returned to his previous duties after the appointment of Tite as head coach, but was again interim in June 2016, as the latter left to manage the Brazil national team.

On 17 September 2016, Carille was named first team coach until the end of the year, replacing dismissed Cristóvão Borges. In October, however, he was replaced by Oswaldo de Oliveira and returned to assistant duties.

On 22 December 2016, Carille was permanently appointed head coach of the main squad for the 2017 campaign. He subsequently won two Campeonato Paulista titles and one Série A with the club before leaving on 22 May after accepting an offer from abroad.

Al-Wehda
Carille joined Saudi club Al-Wehda in May 2018. He left the club in December, after Corinthians agreed to pay his release clause.

Corinthians return
On 7 December 2018, Carille was announced as head coach back at former side Corinthians for the ensuing campaign. He won the 2019 Campeonato Paulista with Timão, but was dismissed on 3 November 2019, after a 4–1 loss to Flamengo.

Al-Ittihad
On 17 February 2020, Carille was appointed as the head coach of the Saudi club, Al-Ittihad. He was sacked on 23 August of the following year, after losing the 2020 Arab Club Champions Cup Final.

Santos
On 8 September 2021, Carille was appointed head coach of Santos, after signing a contract until the end of 2022. He was sacked on 18 February 2022, after a poor start of the new campaign.

Athletico Paranaense
On 13 April 2022, Carille was named head coach of Athletico Paranaense also in the top tier, on a two-year contract. On 4 May, after just 21 days and seven matches, he was sacked.

V-Varen Nagasaki
On 12 June 2022, Carille was announced as manager of J2 League side V-Varen Nagasaki.

Career statistics

Managerial statistics

Honours

Player
Paraná
Campeonato Paranaense: 1996

Manager
Corinthians
Campeonato Brasileiro Série A: 2017
Campeonato Paulista: 2017, 2018, 2019

Individual
Campeonato Paulista Team of the year: 2017

Campeonato Brasileiro Série A Coach of the Year: 2017

 Saudi Professional League Manager of the Month: October 2018, April & May 2021

References

External links
 
 

1973 births
Living people
Footballers from São Paulo
Brazilian footballers
Association football defenders
Campeonato Brasileiro Série A players
Campeonato Brasileiro Série B players
Campeonato Brasileiro Série C players
Sertãozinho Futebol Clube players
Esporte Clube XV de Novembro (Jaú) players
Sport Club Corinthians Paulista players
Iraty Sport Club players
Paraná Clube players
Coritiba Foot Ball Club players
Santa Cruz Futebol Clube players
Esporte Clube XV de Novembro (Piracicaba) players
Esporte Clube Santo André players
Clube de Regatas Brasil players
Clube Atlético Juventus players
Botafogo Futebol Clube (SP) players
Sociedade Esportiva do Gama players
Atlético Monte Azul players
Canoas Sport Club players
Grêmio Barueri Futebol players
Guangzhou F.C. players
Brazilian expatriate footballers
Brazilian expatriate sportspeople in China
Expatriate footballers in China
Brazilian football managers
Campeonato Brasileiro Série A managers
Sport Club Corinthians Paulista managers
Santos FC managers
Club Athletico Paranaense managers
Saudi Professional League managers
Al-Wehda Club (Mecca) managers
Ittihad FC managers
Brazilian expatriate football managers
Brazilian expatriate sportspeople in Saudi Arabia
Expatriate football managers in Saudi Arabia
J2 League managers
V-Varen Nagasaki managers
Brazilian expatriate sportspeople in Japan
Expatriate football managers in Japan
People from Sertãozinho